This is the discography of Singaporean indie pop musician, singer-songwriter and music producer, The Sam Willows, which consists of Benjamin Kheng, Narelle Kheng, Sandra Riley Tang and Jonathan Chua.

The Sam Willows has released two studio albums, two extended plays and eleven singles since their debut in 2012.

Studio albums

Extended plays

Singles

References

Singaporean musical groups